Guido da Polenta may refer to:

 Guido I da Polenta (died 1297), lord of Ravenna
 Guido II da Polenta (died 1330), lord of Ravenna
 Guido III da Polenta (died 1389), lord of Ravenna